"Miracles" is a song by Danish DJ and producer Martin Jensen featuring Bjørnskov. It was released on 6 November 2015 as digital download by Disco:wax. The song has peaked to number 26 on the Danish Singles Chart.

Music video
A music video to accompany the release of "Miracles" was first released onto YouTube on 18 December 2015 at a total length of three minutes and thirty-three seconds.

Track listing

Charts

Weekly charts

Release history

References

2015 songs
2015 singles
Songs written by Peter Bjørnskov
Martin Jensen songs